is a town located in Nagano Prefecture, Japan. , the town had an estimated population of 15,025 in 6211 households, and a population density of 280 persons per km².

Geography
Sakaki is located in the Toushin Region, or north-central region, of Nagano Prefecture. The Chikuma River flows through the town.

Surrounding municipalities
Nagano Prefecture
 Ueda
 Chikuma

Climate
The town has a climate characterized by characterized by hot and humid summers, and cold winters (Köppen climate classification Cfa.  The average annual temperature in Sakaki is 12.4 °C. The average annual rainfall is 1086 mm with September as the wettest month. The temperatures are highest on average in August, at around 25.9 °C, and lowest in January, at around -0.3 °C.

Demographics 
Per Japanese census data, the population of Sakaki has remained relatively constant over the past 70 years.

History
The area of present-day Sakaki was part of ancient Shinano Province. The area was part of the holdings of the short-lived Sakaki Domain (1683–1702) during the early Edo period, and was thereafter tenryō territory controlled directly by the Tokugawa shogunate via the Naka-no-jō daikanshō until the Meiji restoration. The modern village of Sakaki was established on April 1, 1889 by the establishment of the municipalities system and was elevated to town status on July 12, 1904. The town annexed the neighboring villages of Nakanojō and Nanjō on April 1, 1955, and the village of Murakami from neighboring Sarashina District on April 1, 1960.

Economy
Takeuchi Manufacturing, a construction equipment manufacturer, has its headquarters in the city. Agricultural products include rice, horticulture (apples, pears and grapes) and cut flowers.

Education
Sakaki has three public elementary schools and one public middle school operated by the town government, and one high school operated the Nagano Prefectural Board of Education.

Notable places
 Katsurao Castle - A castle ruin, home castle of the Murakami clan.

Transportation

Railway
  Shinano Railway - Shinano Railway Line
 -

Highway
 Jōshin-etsu Expressway

References

External links

Official Website 

 
Towns in Nagano Prefecture